Companhia Nacional de Navegação Aérea ("National Aerial Navigation Company", usually known as CNNA) was a Brazilian aircraft manufacturer of the 1940s.

History
It produced Antônio Muniz designs under licence, as well as prototypes for a wide range of civil aircraft. Its greatest successes were the HL-1 and HL-6, which were purchased in number by the Brazilian government for the country's aeroclubs as part of a pilot training initiative. Business ceased in 1951.

Aircraft

References

 
 São Paulo Technical Museum website
 

Defunct aircraft manufacturers of Brazil
Manufacturing companies based in Rio de Janeiro (city)